Carti or Cartí may refer to:
Playboi Carti (born 1996), American rapper
Cartí Sugtupu, one of the Cartí islands off the coast of Panama
Cartí Airport, airport on Panamanian mainland serving the Cartí islands

See also
Carty, surname